Shin Kwang-hoon (born 18 March 1987) is a South Korean football defender who plays for Pohang Steelers FC.

Club career
He started his professional football career in Pohang Steelers since 2006. Kwang-hoon made 11 appearances for Pohang Steelers. Jeonbuk Hyundai Motors agreed a player swap loaned with Stevica Ristić going in the opposite direction for two and a half years in 2008.

On 3 January 2017, Shin joined FC Seoul.

International career
He played for South Korea at the 2006 AFC Youth Championship and at the subsequent 2007 FIFA U-20 World Cup, 2008 Summer Olympics.

Club career statistics

References

External links
 
 Shin Kwang-hoon  – National Team stats at KFA 
 

1987 births
Living people
Association football fullbacks
South Korean footballers
Pohang Steelers players
Jeonbuk Hyundai Motors players
Ansan Mugunghwa FC players
FC Seoul players
Gangwon FC players
K League 1 players
K League 2 players
Footballers at the 2008 Summer Olympics
Olympic footballers of South Korea
Sportspeople from North Gyeongsang Province
Asian Games medalists in football
Footballers at the 2010 Asian Games
Asian Games bronze medalists for South Korea
Medalists at the 2010 Asian Games